Gorkovsky is a rural locality (a settlement) and the administrative center of Gorkovskoye Rural Settlement, Grayvoronsky District, Belgorod Oblast, Russia. The population was 429 as of 2010. There are 4 streets.

Geography 
Gorkovsky is located 24 km southeast of Grayvoron (the district's administrative centre) by road. Kazachok is the nearest rural locality.

References 

Rural localities in Grayvoronsky District